Bunji-ye Karbasi (also Romanized as Būnjī-ye Karbāsī; also known as Bonjī-ye Karbāsī) is a village in Kangan Rural District, in the Central District of Jask County, Hormozgan Province, Iran. At the 2006 census, its population was 207, in 38 families.

References 

Populated places in Jask County